Weott is a census-designated place in Humboldt County, California. Lower Weott is situated at an elevation of  along the Avenue of the Giants scenic highway and in the flood plain of the South Fork of the Eel River. The population was 288 at the 2010 census.

History
The Wishosk word for that area and the people who lived there was wíyat. The general name for this group is now Wiyot. The town of Weott is beyond the bounds of the areas known to have been utilized or inhabited by the Wiyot. In 1849, when whites arrived looking for new supply routes to the Trinity gold mines, the Sinkyone peoples were living in the area. The Wiyot were further north and currently occupy the Table Bluff Reservation outside Loleta. Indian Agent Redick McKee's 1851 expedition brought a rush of homestead filings. Native groups militated against this. The resulting conflicts led to the establishment of organized vigilante committees such as the Volunteer Company of Dragoons and continued through at least the 1870s.

Before 1925, Weott had been known informally as Helm's Mill or Helm's Camp. Helm's Camp set up where redwood ties were being made for the railroad being constructed along the Eel River. It was later known as McKee's Mill (named for Ernest McKee, who operated a shingle mill just east of lower Weott, but was lost in the flood of 1964. When the residents submitted a request to the United States Postal Service for a post office in that year, however, they had to decide on a definitive name.  At least one source records that the residents were required to do this because there was already a town named McKee in California, but this appears to not be true. Another source says that a naming contest led to the name Weott, yet another that the USPOD chose the name from several submitted. The ZIP Code is 95571, with four-digit suffixes tied to post office box numbers. There is no home delivery in Weott. Weott is in area code 707.

Flooding

See also Christmas Week flood of 1955 and Christmas flood of 1964

Though Weott had been hit by a flood in 1930, its recent history is shaped by two later major floods. In December 1955, lower Weott was partially destroyed when the South Fork of the Eel River overflowed its banks. The storm was so intense that it destroyed 26 U.S. Geological Survey stream gauges. As a result, much of the flood data comes from qualitative reports and post-flood estimates. Other northern California rivers, such as the Russian, Eel, Klamath and Rogue Rivers, also rose to unprecedented heights. Tens of small towns were inundated. One of the worst hit was Weott.

The greater area of Weott encompasses the Bull Creek, Dyerville, South Fork, Camp Grant and Burlington areas. Weott's local services are run by the Weott Community Service District, which controls the town's sewage treatment facility and water supply. It now comes from a spring west of town, across the Eel River. The California State Parks has tried to provide Weott with alternatives to the spring, which is on State Parks land, including constructing a well on the Weott side of the river in 2003. This well had too much sediment, though, and was not usable. The WCSD has surveyed lands in the surrounding watershed but has yet to find an alternative water source. In summer, early morning and late evening fog typically protect the area from temperature extremes. Though daytime highs occasionally reach into the high s, they are more typically below . Due to its proximity to the ocean and its position in the shadow of  Grasshopper Peak, the area has an intense rainy season lasting from November through May. Due to its moist climate, the town is surrounded on most sides by redwoods. Weott is located close to Giant Tree, a  redwood, and the Dyerville Giant, a  redwood that toppled in 1991. Due to a lack of water storage capacity, Weott sometimes suffers from water rationing in the summers.

Demographics
The 2010 United States Census reported that Weott had a population of 288, 100% of whom lived in households. The population density was 144.2 people/km. The racial makeup of Weott was 87.5% White, 4.5% Native American, 0.3% Asian, 1.0% from other races, and 6.6% from two or more races. Hispanic or Latino of any race were 6.9%. There were no African Americans or Pacific Islanders recorded.

There were 134 households, out of which 26.9% had children under the age of 18, 38.1% were opposite-sex married couples living together, 10.4% had a female householder with no husband present, 9.7% had a male householder with no wife present. There were 11.2% unmarried opposite-sex partnerships, and 1.5% same-sex married couples or partnerships. 35.1% of households were made up of a sole occupant, 6.7% had a sole occupant 65 or older. The average household size was 2.15. 58.2% of households housed families; the average family size was 2.67.

The population age distribution was spread out relatively evenly: under 18 years, 18.8%, from 18 to 24, 6.9%, from 25 - 44, 23.3%, from 45 - 64, 38.2% and 65 and older 12.8%. The median age was 45.6 years. For every 100 females, there were 102.8 males. For every 100 females age 18 and over, there were 103.5 males.

There were 143 housing units at an average density of 71.6/km, of which 134 were occupied, of which 65.7% were owner-occupied and 34.3% were renter-occupied. The homeowner vacancy rate was 1.1%; the rental vacancy rate was 4.2%. 70.5% of the population lived in owner-occupied housing units and 29.5% lived in rental housing units.

Economy
In 1987, long-time resident Velma Childs listed the pre-1955-flood businesses in Weott. These included a candy store, ice cream store, two gasoline stations, a laundromat, a bar, two cafes, three restaurants, two car-garages, a Ford agency, a church, a movie theatre, two grocery stores, a dress shop, a telephone office (to connect callers via party line), a print shop, a chainsaw shop, a sporting goods store, a beauty shop and an apple orchard along a 400 meter stretch of the Avenue of the Giants. She also listed thirteen homes in lower Weott. The 1955 flood destroyed or damaged beyond repair the theatre, two motels, a grocery, a service station, the bar and a restaurant. The other businesses repaired their buildings. After the 1964 flood, only one house was rebuilt on the old site. Residents and some businesses moved uphill far enough to be above any possible flood waters, the majority did not return. The 1964 flood was famously described by Governor Edmund Brown as a "thousand year flood," though in fact it has been rated a 290-year flood.

The former economic base for Weott residents—primary and secondary lumber industries—has largely disappeared. Some locals commute to jobs in nearby communities or work with government entities such as the school district or Humboldt-Redwoods State Park. Retirees also make up an important part of the community.

Arts and culture

Events
It has included a 10 km race since 1993 and a 21.1 km race since 2002. The Humboldt Redwoods Marathon has taken place on the second Sunday of October since 1976. It now also includes 5 km and 21.1 km races. The  race has served as the Pacific Association of the United States Track and Field Association championship for several years. There is a large spaghetti feed at Weott's Milligan Hall for the runners before the races. Since 1951, Weott has also been host to the Southern Humboldt Garden Club Flower Show. It is currently held at the Agnes J. Johnson Elementary School on the fourth Sunday in May. Local gardeners enter prized roses and other flowers from their gardens for a chance to win ribbons and prizes. The show also includes plant sales, food and other crafts. There are various seasonal activities at the Humboldt-Redwood State Park headquarters, including guided nature walks and Christmas tree lightings.

Government
The Town of Weott has a special service district (Weott Community Services District) to provide water and sewer connections within its borders.

Infrastructure

Facilities
Weott does not have many commercial services since the general store, which first opened in 1919, last closed in 2003. The town has a post office, a Cal Fire station and the public, tuition-free, TK-9 Agnes J. Johnson Charter School.  The Charter School will serve all students in grades TK-12 by 2025.  The Charter School, authorized by Humboldt County Board of Education, draws from several communities in the area.  The Cal Fire station was torn down in 2010 and rebuilt. 
 There is one community center, Milligan Hall, named after a long-time resident. This building was the town’s schoolhouse from 1923–1954 and later a Legion Hall. At least once the surrounding land was used as a Cal Fire tent camp, presumably for firefighting.  At one time, the town had two churches, Faith Chapel Assembly of God and the non-denominational Weott Christian Church. The Weott Christian Church, which was established in 1954, has had its non-profit status suspended until it comes into compliance with the California Franchise Tax Board or the Office of the Secretary of State. The Faith Chapel is still functioning.

Weott Center, located at the off-ramp of Highway 101, was for many years home to the Sequoia Hotel, a restaurant, a Union 76 gasoline station and a company that made redwood curios. None of these businesses has survived.  south of Weott is Burlington Campground, which also hosts the Humboldt Redwoods State Park visitor center. This is one of several campgrounds in the Humboldt Redwoods State Park, but is the only campground open year-round. The closest major shopping facilities are in Garberville ( south) and Fortuna ( north).

Until 2010, Weott had access only to dial-up internet service. In 2010, high speed internet access became available in the town.

Transportation
Two roads provide access to Weott: State Highway 254 (the Avenue of the Giants ) and U.S. Highway 101, both of which are oriented north to south. Weott can be reached from the Avenue of the Giants, but has not had a significant presence on it since the 1964 flood. Highway 101, which was built in 1962, goes through the upper portion of the town and has a dedicated off-ramp and on-ramp for both directions. Though both roads lead through Humboldt Redwoods State Park, the Avenue of the Giants is a scenic route popular with RV, motorcycle, and bicycle tourers. During the summer months there are several accessible swimming holes along the Avenue near Weott. Weott is surrounded by old homesteads that are now part of the State Park. Many of these homesteads still have remnants of orchards and some have remnants of the old structures.

See also

References

External links
 Weott CA, Resource Guide

Census-designated places in Humboldt County, California
Census-designated places in California